Wijchen is a railway station located in Wijchen, Netherlands. The station was opened in 1881 and is located on the Tilburg–Nijmegen railway. The train services are operated by Nederlandse Spoorwegen.

Train services
The following services currently call at Wijchen:
2x per hour local services (stoptrein) (Arnhem Centraal -) Nijmegen - Oss - 's-Hertogenbosch
2x per hour local services (stoptrein) (Wijchen -) Nijmegen - Arnhem Centraal - Zutphen

External links
NS website 
Dutch Public Transport journey planner 

Railway stations in Gelderland
Railway stations opened in 1881
Wijchen
1881 establishments in the Netherlands
Railway stations in the Netherlands opened in the 19th century